Communist Party Congress could refer to:

Ruling or former ruling communist parties
 Congress of the Socialist Unity Party of Germany
 National Congress of the Communist Party of Vietnam
 National Congress of the Communist Party of China
 Congress of the Romanian Communist Party
 Congress of the Communist Party of the Soviet Union
 Congresses of the Communist Party of Lithuania

Non-ruling communist party congresses
 Congresses of the Communist Party of Brazil